Penny & Giles (P&G) was a British engineering company in Dorset (former Hampshire) that made flight recorders (black boxes).

History
The company was founded in 1956 by Prof William Alfred Penny and James Giles. It made high-reliability wire-wound potentiometers for aircraft in flight testing.

In 1957 it made the first aircraft data recorder with magnetic recording on a stainless steel wire, known as a black box. In 1963, the Ministry of Aviation informed the UK aircraft industry that all civil airliners would have to have flight data recorders.

In April 1973, Penny and Giles Conductive Plastics received a Queen's Award for Enterprise: Innovation (Technology). It became known as Penny and Giles International, with four divisions. In April 1992 it won another Queen's Award for Enterprise.

In the 1990s it was known as Penny & Giles Data Recorders Limited, and claimed to be the world's leading manufacturer of aircraft data recorders.

Ownership
In 1992 it was bought by Bowthorpe Holdings for £30m.

The company was bought out in 2002 by Curtiss-Wright of the USA, and is now part of Curtiss-Wright Controls Integrated Sensing.

Structure
It was headquartered at Mudeford in Dorset.

Products
 LVDT and RVDT transducers
 Optical Quick Access Recorders (O-QAR) for civil airliners

See also
 Teledyne Controls

References

External links
 Grace's Guide
 Penny & Giles Transducers

Aircraft component manufacturers of the United Kingdom
Aircraft recorders
Aviation history of the United Kingdom
British companies established in 1956
Companies based in Dorset
Curtiss-Wright Company
Manufacturing companies established in 1956